The National Autonomous University of Léon, founded in 1812, is a university in Nicaragua. It was the second university founded in Central America and the last founded under the colonial rule of the Spanish Empire.

History
The first institution of higher learning in the colony of Nicaragua was the Conciliar Seminary of St. Raymond Nonnatus, or Tridentine College, which had been founded in 1680 by Andrés de las Navas y Quevedo, O. de M., a friar of the Mercedarian Order who was the Bishop of Nicaragua. He did this upon his appointment to the leadership of that diocese in keeping with the requirements established by the Council of Trent for the training of the clergy of the Catholic Church.

The university was founded in 1812 by decree of the Cortes of Cádiz to raise this institution to a higher academic level. The original curriculum consisted of Civil law, Canon law and medicine. Pharmaceutical studies were soon added.

References

External links

Educational institutions established in 1812
Universities and colleges in Nicaragua
1812 establishments in the Spanish Empire